Miklavž pri Taboru is a dispersed settlement in the Municipality of Tabor in central Slovenia. The area is part of the traditional region of Styria. The municipality is now included in the Savinja Statistical Region.

Name
The name of the settlement was changed from Sveti Miklavž pri Taboru (literally, 'Saint Nicholas near Tabor') to Miklavž pri Taboru (literally, 'Nicholas near Tabor') in 1955. The name was changed on the basis of the 1948 Law on Names of Settlements and Designations of Squares, Streets, and Buildings as part of efforts by Slovenia's postwar communist government to remove religious elements from toponyms.

Church
The local church from which the settlement gets its name is dedicated to Saint Nicholas and belongs to the Parish of Sveti Jurij ob Taboru. It is a 15th-century church that was greatly rebuilt in the 19th century.

References

External links
Miklavž pri Taboru at Geopedia

Populated places in the Municipality of Tabor